"Make Some Noise" is a song by American actress and recording artist, Miley Cyrus, performing as Hannah Montana – the alter ego of Miley Stewart – a character she played on the Disney Channel TV series Hannah Montana. It was released on May 3, 2007 as the second and final single from the Hannah Montana 2: Meet Miley Cyrus album.

Background and composition
Written and produced by Andy Dodd and Adam Watts, "Make Some Noise" has a length of four minutes and forty-four seconds. Lyrically, the song urges teens to stand up and "make some noise" for what they believe in.

Critical reception
Heather Phares, writing for AllMusic, described the song as a "less-inspired [version] of the shiny, synth-driven pop and strummy acoustic ballads that made the first Hannah Montana soundtrack a hit."

Chart performance
The song debuted at number 73 on Hot Digital Songs which led to it making into the Billboard Hot 100, for the week ending July 14, 2007. The song debuted and peaked at number 92 in the Hot 100. On the same week, the song debuted and peaked at number 78 on the now defunct Pop 100.

Live performances
Cyrus, dressed as Montana, premiered "Make Some Noise", along with eight other songs, at the concert taping for the second season of Hannah Montana. The live video has been used as a music video on the Disney Channel and was released onto iTunes in 2007.

Charts

References

2007 singles
Hannah Montana songs
Walt Disney Records singles
Songs from television series
Songs written by Adam Watts (musician)
Songs written by Andy Dodd
2007 songs